This is a list of instant foods. Instant foods are convenience foods which require minimal preparation, typically just adding water or milk. Some authors define "instant" food as requiring less than five minutes of preparation and "ultra-instant food" as requiring less than one minute. Instant foods are often dehydrated, freeze-dried, or condensed.

Instant foods

 
 Instant baby food – dehydrated baby food was produced by Gerber and Heinz in the 1980s. Dehydrated baby food products produced by both companies consisted of dehydrated food flakes. The Gerber product never came to fruition as a widely used product; it was only test-run in Omaha, Nebraska, for around eight to nine months, and consumer adoption was not sufficient for the product to go into mass production.
 Pablum
 Bird's Custard
 Camping food
 Condensed soup
 Powdered eggs
 Instant gravy – Bisto is a brand of powdered instant gravy that has been produced and consumed in Great Britain since 1908.
 Instant mashed potatoes
 Smash – a brand of Instant mashed potatoes in the United Kingdom
 Instant noodle
 Cup noodle
 List of instant noodle brands
 Instant oatmeal – Quaker Instant Oatmeal is an example
 Instant pudding
 Instant porridge – an example is Cream of Wheat brand, which includes an instant variety in its product line
 Instant rice
 Minute Rice – an instant rice brand
 Instant curry
 S&B Foods - an instant curry brand
 Instant soup
 Cup-a-Soup
 Portable soup
 Instant sauce mixes
 Instant tofu powder – introduced and produced circa 1966 by Japan Protein Industry (Nihon Tanpaku Kogyo), it was used at that time as a time-saver for the production of tofu. Later in 1973, a brand of instant tofu powder named Hausu Hontôfu was produced and marketed to consumers by the Hausu Foods Company.

Beverages

 Awake – a short-lived artificial orange juice formulated by General Foods Corporation and introduced in 1964. It was a predecessor to Tang.
 Instant breakfast
 Chocolate beverages
 Hot chocolate
 Swiss Miss – hot chocolate
 Milo – can be prepared cold or hot
 Nesquik
 Ovaltine
 Instant coffee
 Drink mix
 Freeze-dried fruit juices 
 Powdered milk – in a 1986 session in Moscow, Russia, the International Dairy Federation defined instant skim milk powder as qualifying for the term "instant" when no more than fifteen seconds are required for all lumps to disappear when the powder is mixed with water and stirred.
 Coconut milk powder
 Tang – a fruit-flavored drink that was originally formulated by General Foods Corporation food scientist William A. Mitchell in 1957. It was first marketed in powdered form in 1959. The Tang brand is owned by Mondelēz International.
 Instant tea
  Instant milk tea – a mass-produced instant powder

Rations

 Field ration – a field ration, combat ration or ration pack is a canned or pre-packaged meal, easily prepared and eaten, transported by military troops on the battlefield.
 Humanitarian daily ration
 Individual Meal Pack
 Meal, Ready-to-Eat
 Military rations

See also

 Canned food
 Convenience food
 Dehydrated food
 Dried fruit
 List of dried foods
 Frozen food
 Index of military food articles
 Instant hot water dispenser
 Space food
 Fast food
 List of foods
 List of smoked foods
 Snack food
 List of snack foods
 TV Dinner

References

Further reading

External links
 
 Instant Foods: Are They Good for You?. Food Network.
 Natural Ready to Eat Foods. Chokhi Dhani Foods.

Lists of foods by type